Sayonara is a 1957 American film starring Marlon Brando. 

Sayonara may also refer to:

Fiction
 Sayonara (novel), a 1954 novel by James A. Michener
 Sayonara (2015 film), a Japanese film by Kōji Fukada
 "Sayonara" (The Jeffersons), a 1985 two-part television episode

Music
 Sayonara (album), by Die Flippers, or the title song, 1994
 "Sayonara" (Orange Range song), 2006
 "Sayonara", a song by James from Wah Wah, 1994
 "Sayonara", a song by Mary MacGregor from the film Adieu Galaxy Express 999, 1981
 "Sayonara", a song by Miranda Cosgrove from High Maintenance, 2011
 "Sayonara", a song by Off Course, 1979
 "Sayonara", a song by the Pogues from Hell's Ditch, 1990
 "Sayonara", a song by Red Velvet from Sappy, 2019
 "Sayonara", a song by A Taste of Honey, 1982
 "Sayonara", a song written by Irving Berlin, 1957

Ships
 Sayonara, a yacht that competed in the 1998 Sydney to Hobart Yacht Race
 USS Sayonara II (SP-587), a US Navy patrol boat 1917–1919

See also
 
 

Sayonara